My Favourite Headache (also published as My Favorite Headache, especially in the United States) is the debut solo album by Geddy Lee of Canadian rock band Rush. The album was released on November 14, 2000, by Anthem Records in Canada and Atlantic Records outside of Canada. Both the title track and "Grace to Grace" received play on mainstream rock radio, and the album itself peaked at No. 52 on the Billboard 200.

Background
Although Lee wrote the majority of the album on bass, he was not just writing melody lines, he was also playing chords. In some cases, he multi-tracked basses into different layers of the arrangements.
 
Lee said of the album: "I think I backed into this project. I've never had a great desire to make an individual statement, and I certainly didn't want any more attention. I satisfy so much of my musical self in the context of Rush, so I don't have any great frustrations from that point of view. But once in a while, you'd wonder, 'What's it like out there? What's it like to work with other people?'".
 
Lee explaining how he wrote the lyrics for My Favourite Headache: "Most people are like this: They think of stuff during the day. The mind goes to certain places, they remember things, and they try to figure things out. To remind yourself to write that stuff down is a great benefit. Then you come back to it and you analyze it days later, and lyrically shape what you felt when you wrote it down. For me, how I feel about what I wrote down turns into a song."

Track listing
All lyrics by Geddy Lee, all music by Lee and Ben Mink.

Personnel
Personnel per booklet.

Musicians
Geddy Lee - bass guitar, vocals, guitar, piano, programming, percussion, string arrangements, producer, engineer
Ben Mink  - guitars, violins and violas, programming, string arrangements, producer, engineer
Matt Cameron - drums
Jeremy Taggart - drums on "Home on the Strange"
John Friesen - cellos on "Working at Perfekt"
Ed Wilson - additional programming
Chris Stringer - additional percussion
Waylon Wall - steel guitar on "Window to the World"
Pappy Rosen - backing vocals on "Slipping"

Production
David Leonard - producer, engineer, mixing at Metalworks Studios
Adam Kasper, Dennis Tougas - engineers
Sam Hofstedt, Sheldon Zaharko, Chris Stringer, Tom Heron, Jeff Elliot, Joel Kazmi, Ian Bodzasi - assistant engineers
Daniel Séguin - computer technical assistance
Howie Weinberg - mastering at Masterdisk, New York

Singles

References

2000 debut albums
Geddy Lee albums
Atlantic Records albums
Albums produced by David Leonard (record producer)
Anthem Records albums